"Cinema" is an instrumental by the progressive rock band Yes, from their 1983 album, 90125. In 1985 it won the Grammy Award for Best Rock Instrumental Performance, the band's only Grammy.

History 
The 1980 incarnation of Yes included Trevor Horn, Geoff Downes, Steve Howe, Chris Squire and Alan White. When this group split up following the tour for the album Drama, Squire and White joined forces with singer and guitarist Trevor Rabin. The three were eventually joined by former Yes member Tony Kaye, and the four began writing and recording demos under the band name "Cinema".

Chris Squire played some of the band Cinema's recordings with former Yes lead singer Jon Anderson, who expressed interest in participating in the project. With four out of the five having been Yes members, it was decided to change the name of the band from Cinema to Yes. The title of the instrumental track "Cinema" is therefore an acknowledgement of the four-piece band that co-wrote and performed it, before Anderson joined and the band was renamed Yes.

"Cinema" developed from a twenty-minute-long track with the working title "Time". At just over two minutes in length, "Cinema" is the shortest track on 90125,
and one of the shortest tracks Yes has recorded. Although the band had recorded short tracks before, they were well known in the 1970s
for entire albums of lengthy songs, such as 1973's Tales from Topographic Oceans, which has four songs, none shorter than 18 minutes. "Cinema" is one of two songs on 90125 (the other being "Leave It") that does not list Anderson as a co-writer.

Live performances 
In the 9012Live concert video, "Cinema" was the first song played, preceding "Leave It" as it does on 90125.

In later years, Yes would follow "Cinema" with "Owner of a Lonely Heart" instead, as seen in the House of Yes: Live from House of Blues video concert.
In 2004, current and former Yes members Squire, White, Rabin, Howe, and Downes united to perform "Cinema" and "Owner of a Lonely Heart" at the Prince's Trust concert honouring Trevor Horn.

References

Yes (band) songs
Song recordings produced by Trevor Horn
1980s instrumentals
Songs written by Trevor Rabin
Songs written by Chris Squire
Grammy Award for Best Rock Instrumental Performance
Rock instrumentals